Scienceworks is a science museum in Melbourne, Australia. It is a venue of Museums Victoria which administers the cultural and scientific collections of the State of Victoria. It is located in the suburb of Spotswood.

Opened on 28 March 1992, Scienceworks is housed in a purpose-built building "styled along industrial lines" near the historic Spotswood Pumping Station, constructed in 1897, whose steam engines form an associated exhibit.

Displays and activities offered by the museum include hands-on experiments, demonstrations, and tours. The "lightning room" is a 120-seat auditorium that presents demonstrations about electricity, featuring a giant Tesla Coil, capable of generating two million volts of electricity, producing three metre lightning bolts.  Melbourne Planetarium is housed on site.

Until late 2013, the 1883 clock tower from Flinders Street station was also located at the museum. The clock had been moved to Princes Bridge station in 1905 and Spencer Street station in 1911, where it remained until sold into private ownership after the station redevelopment of 1967. The clock restored with an electric movement is now located at the Southern Cross station.

Gallery

References

External links
Scienceworks website

Museums in Melbourne
Technology museums in Australia
Science museums in Australia
Museums established in 1992
1992 establishments in Australia
Science and technology in Melbourne
Tourist attractions in Victoria (Australia)
Buildings and structures in the City of Hobsons Bay